Henry Benson may refer to:

 Henry L. Benson (1854–1921), American politician and jurist in the state of Oregon
 Henry Benson (MP) ( 1578–1643), English politician who sat in the House of Commons variously between 1626 and 1641
 Henry Roxby Benson (1818–1892), British general
 Henry Benson, Baron Benson (1909–1995), British accountant 
 Henry N. Benson (1872–1960), American lawyer and politician
 Henry Benson (soldier) (1824–1862), American artillery officer

See also
Harry Benson (disambiguation)